Aluminium oxynitride (marketed under the name ALON by Surmet Corporation) is a transparent ceramic composed of aluminium, oxygen and nitrogen. Aluminium oxynitride is optically transparent (≥ 80%) in the near-ultraviolet, visible, and mid-wave-infrared regions of the electromagnetic spectrum. It is four times as hard as fused silica glass, 85% as hard as sapphire, and nearly 115% as hard as magnesium aluminate spinel. It can be fabricated into transparent windows, plates, domes, rods, tubes, and other forms using conventional ceramic powder processing techniques.

Aluminium oxynitride is the hardest polycrystalline transparent ceramic available commercially. Because of its relatively low weight, distinctive optical and mechanical properties, and resistance to oxidation or radiation, it shows promise for applications such as bulletproof, blast-resistant, and optoelectronic windows. Aluminium oxynitride-based armour has been shown to stop multiple armour-piercing projectiles of up to .50 BMG.

Properties 

Aluminium oxynitride is resistant to various acids, bases, and water.

Mechanical

Aluminium oxynitride has the following mechanical properties:

 Compressive strength 2.68 GPa
 Flexural strength 0.38–0.7 GPa
 Fracture toughness 2.0 MPa·m1/2
 Knoop hardness 1800 kg/mm2 (0.2 kg load)
 Poisson ratio 0.24
 Shear modulus 135 GPa
 Young's modulus 334 GPa

Thermal and optical

Aluminium oxynitride has the following thermal and optical properties:

 Specific heat 0.781 J/(g·°C)
 Thermal conductivity 12.3 W/(m·°C)
 Thermal expansion coefficient ~4.7/°C
 Transparency range 200–5000 nm

Applications 
Aluminium oxynitride is used for infrared-optical windows, with greater than 80% transparency at wavelengths below about 4 micrometers, dropping to near zero at about 6 micrometers. It has also been demonstrated as an interface passivation layer in some semiconductor-related applications.

Aluminium oxynitride has less than half the weight and thickness of glass-based transparent armour.  thick aluminium oxynitride armour is capable of stopping .50 BMG armour-piercing rounds, which can penetrate  of traditional glass laminate.

In 2005, the United States Air Force began testing aluminium oxynitride-based armor.

Manufacture 
Aluminium oxynitride can be fabricated as windows, plates, domes, rods, tubes and other forms using conventional ceramic powder processing techniques. Its composition can vary slightly: the aluminium content from about 30% to 36%, which has been reported to affect the bulk and shear moduli by only 1–2%. The fabricated greenware is subjected to heat treatment (densification) at elevated temperatures followed by grinding and polishing to transparency. The grinding and polishing substantially improves the impact resistance and other mechanical properties of armour.

Patents 
Patents related to aluminium oxynitride include:

 Aluminium oxynitride having improved optical characteristics and method of manufacture TM Hartnett, RL Gentilman , 1984
 Process for producing polycrystalline cubic aluminium oxynitride JW McCauley , 1980
 Transparent aluminium oxynitride-based ceramic article JP Mathers , 1993

See also 
 Aluminium nitride
 Corundum
 Transparent ceramics

References

External links 
 Processing of Optically Transparent Aluminum Oxynitride
 Solubility Limits of La and Y in Aluminum Oxynitride (AlON) at 1870°C Lior Miller and Wayne D. Kaplan. Department of Materials Engineering, Technion, Haifa, Israel, 2006
 The Influence of Sintering Additives on the Microstructure and Properties of ALON. Yechezkel Ashuach. Master's Thesis, Technion – Israel Institute of Technology, 2003

Oxides
Nitrides
Aluminium compounds
Ceramic materials
Transparent materials